CTrain is a light rail system in Calgary, Alberta, Canada. It has been in operation since May 25, 1981. The system is operated by Calgary Transit, as part of the Calgary municipal government's transportation department.

Most CTrain track is at grade, within its own right-of-way. The downtown portion services both transit lines along the 7th Avenue South transit mall at street level, and is shared between the CTrain, Calgary Transit buses, and City of Calgary vehicles. This portion is a zero-fare zone and serves as a downtown people mover. The tracks split at the east and west ends of downtown into lines leading to the south, northeast, west and northwest residential neighbourhoods of Calgary. Six percent of the system is underground, and seven percent is grade-separated (elevated). Trains are powered by overhead electric wires, using pantographs to draw power.

List of CTrain stations
Key

Active stations

Former stations

Ghost station

This underground station was built under the Municipal Building as part of a proposed future 8th Avenue subway. There is a short section of unused transit tunnel leading to it from the South leg that was blocked off after underground urban explorers started following it into the station.

References

 
Light rail in Canada
Lists of railway stations in Canada
Calgary
Calgary-related lists